The Coolock feud is a series of allegedly connected murders that happened in Dublin in 2019.

Murder of Zach Parker
Zach Parker was shot dead on 17 January 2019 outside a gym in Applewood Close in Swords. He was driving out of a car park when a gunman shot him and his passenger. Parker, 23, died at the scene and his 25-year-old passenger was taken to Beaumont Hospital. He had been convicted of drug dealing after being caught with almost €3,000 worth of cocaine in February 2017. Gardaí believe the shooting was to do with local drug dealing. Gardaí believe that he owed money to a group known as the Gucci gang, based in Finglas. The Gucci gang is essentially a subset of the Kinahan gang. Gardaí believe that he had secured a relatively small amount of drugs on credit from the gang which were later seized by Gardaí. One avenue of investigation is that he was killed because he wasn't able to pay back his debts to the gang.

Murder of Seán Little
Seán Little was shot dead on 21 May 2019 and his body was found beside a burning Opel Insignia at Rowan's Little, near Walshestown, near junction 5 of the M1. He was 22, associated with the leader of a Finglas-based gang and allegedly had close links to Dublin members of the Kinahan gang. The case is being investigated by Gardaí from Balbriggan.

Gardaí believe Little was killed because he wanted revenge for the murder of his friend Zach Parker.

Murder of Jordan Davis
Jordan Davis was shot dead on 22 May 2019 in a laneway off Marigold Road, Darndale. He was bringing his four month old son for a walk in a buggy when he was shot. He was also friends with Seán Little.

In June 2019 a man was arrested in connection with his murder and charged.

Murder of Hamid Sanambar
Hamid Sanambar, aged 41, was shot dead at the home of his friend Seán Little on Kilbarron Avenue in Coolock. He was a known associate of several crime gangs, including the Kinahans.

Gardaí are investigating several lines of inquiry, including the murder being retaliation by another gang or Mr. Sanambar being set up by his own associates.

Murder of Eoin Boylan
Eoin Boylan was shot dead on 24 November 2019 in the garden of his home on Clonsaugh Avenue, Coolock, around 5:15pm. He had been formally warned by Gardaí that his life was in danger and he was advised to leave the area for safety. He only left for one night. He had survived previous attempts on his life. Gardaí are investigating if comments he may have made about Littles' murder on social media are connected.

May 2020 shooting
An unnamed man in his 30s was shot on 20 May 2020 on Cromcastle Drive in Coolock. The man was shot around 2pm outside a house, receiving leg wounds. He was attended to by Gardaí and paramedics before being taken to Beaumount Hospital a kilometre away. The target, who is from Cromcastle Estate, had a long history of involvement with crime.

Gardaí are not clear if the attack is related to the Coolock feud and they have not ruled out the possibility that it is related to a feud in Darndale.

The shooting happened 300m from where Hamid Sanambar was shot dead on Kilbarron Avenue.

Arrest and conviction of Stephen Little and Edward McDonnell

Arrests
On 14 September 2019 Gardaí pulled over a car at Lein Park, Harmonstown and arrested Stephen Little, 47, of Kilbarron Avenue, Kilmore and Edward McDonnell of Waterside Apartments, New Ross, County Wexford. The Gardaí found they had a semi-automatic pistol, two balaclavas, two baseball bats, gloves, mobile phones, a can of petrol and a long-handled lighter. They were taken to Clontarf Garda station and Little told Gardaí after his arrest "had you given me another hour, I would have killed the bastard that killed him" and also "I lost my marriage and my son". Both men had been under surveillance by the Drugs and Organised Crime Bureau.

Trial
The trial took place in the non-jury Special Criminal Court.

Stephen Little pleaded guilty to unlawful possession of a Grand Power G9 semi-automatic pistol at Lein Park, Harmonstown. The court was told that if Little had not made the comment to Gardaí about being given another hour the case against him would have been weaker and he may not have been charged.

Edward McDonnell initially pleaded not guilty but on the fifth day of the trial changed his plea to guilty to the same charge. They were jailed for possession of a firearm under suspicious circumstances, an offence under section Section 27A (1) of the Firearms Act.

McDonnell had 47 previous convictions, including attempted robbery, sexual assault and assault causing harm.

Mr Tony Hunt, the judge, said that the men were involved in serious and organised crime and that the "timely intervention" of Gardaí had prevented serious harm or death.

Sentencing
Little was sentenced to six years imprisonment, McDonnell to nine.

References

2019 in Ireland
2010s murders in the Republic of Ireland
Conflicts in 2019
Organized crime conflicts in Ireland
Conflicts in 2020
2010s in Dublin (city)
2020s in Dublin (city)